Carmen Gracia RE (born 1935) is an Argentinian artist-printmaker.

Gracia left Argentina for Paris in 1960 and joined the printmaking studio Atelier 17, run by William Hayter. She later studied at the Slade School of Fine Art. 

Examples of Gracia's work are included in the British Council art collection, the UK Government Art Collection, the Victoria and Albert Museum, the Calouste Gulbenkian Museum, the Cuming Museum and the Indianapolis Museum of Art.

References

1935 births
Living people
20th-century Argentine women artists
20th-century printmakers
21st-century Argentine women artists
21st-century printmakers
21st-century Argentine artists
Alumni of the Slade School of Fine Art